Ancient music refers to the musical cultures and practices that developed in the literate civilizations of the ancient world. Succeeding the music of prehistoric societies and lasting until the Post-classical era, major centers of Ancient music developed in China (the Shang, Zhou, Qin and Han dynasties), Egypt (the Old, Middle and New Kingdoms), Greece (the Archaic, Classical and Hellenistic periods), India (the Maurya, Shunga, Kanva, Kushan, Satavahana and Gupta dynasties), Iran/Persia (the Median, Achaemenid, Seleucid, Parthian and Sasanian Empires), the Maya civilization, Mesopotamia, and Rome (the Roman Republic and Empire). Though extremely diverse, the music of ancient civilizations is frequently characterized by monophony, improvisation and the dominance of text in musical settings.

Overview
Written musical notation was the first mark of a literate society. During the time of prehistoric music, people had a tendency to primarily convey their music and ideas through oral means. However, with the rise of social classes, many European and Asian societies regarded literacy as superior to illiteracy, which caused people to begin writing down their musical notations. This made music evolve from simply hearing music and transmitting it orally, to keeping records and personal interpretations of musical themes.

Regions

Egypt

Music has been an integral part of Egyptian culture since antiquity. The ancient Egyptians credited the goddess Bat with the invention of music; she was later syncretized with another goddess, Hathor. Osiris used this music from Hathor to civilize the world. The earliest material and representational evidence of Egyptian musical instruments dates to the Predynastic period, but the evidence is more securely attested in tomb paintings from the Old Kingdom when harps, end-blown flutes (held diagonally), and single and double pipes of the clarinet type (with single reeds) were played. Percussion instruments, and lutes were added to orchestras by the Middle Kingdom. Bronze cymbals dating from the Roman period (30 BCE–641 CE) have been found in a tomb on a site near Naucratis. Although experiments have been carried out with surviving Egyptian instruments (on the spacing of holes in flutes and reed pipes, and attempts to reconstruct the stringing of lyres, harps, and lutes), only the Tutankhamun trumpets and some percussion instruments yield any secure idea of how ancient Egyptian instruments sounded. None of the many theories that have been formulated have any adequate foundation.

Mesopotamia

In 1986, Anne Draffkorn Kilmer, professor of ancient history and Mediterranean archaeology at the University of California, Berkeley, published her decipherment of a cuneiform tablet, dating back to 2000 BCE from Nippur, one of the most ancient Sumerian cities. She claimed that the tablet contained fragmentary instructions for performing and composing music in harmonies of thirds, and was written using a diatonic scale. The notation in the first tablet was not as developed as the notation in the later cuneiform Hurrian tablets from Ugarit, dated by Kilmer to about 1250 BCE. The interpretation of the notation system is still controversial (at least five rival interpretations have been published), but it is clear that the notation indicates the names of strings on a lyre, and its tuning is described in other tablets. These tablets represent the earliest recorded melodies, though fragmentary, from anywhere in the world.

Harps of Ur

In 1929, Leonard Woolley discovered pieces of four different harps while excavating the ruins of the ancient city Ur, located in what was Ancient Mesopotamia and what is now contemporary Iraq. The fragments have been dated to 2750 BCE and some are now located at the University of Pennsylvania, the British Museum in London, and in Baghdad. Various reconstructions and restorations of the instruments have been attempted, but it was observed by many that none have been completely satisfactory. Depending on various definitions, they could be classified as lyres rather than harps, the most famous being the bull-headed harp, held in Baghdad. However, the Iraq War in 2003 led to the destruction of the bull-head lyre by looters.

Hurrian music

India

The Samaveda consists of a collection (samhita) of hymns, portions of hymns, and detached verses, all but 75 taken from the Rigveda, to be sung, using specifically indicated melodies called Samagana, by Udgatar priests at sacrifices in which the juice of the soma plant, clarified and mixed with milk and other ingredients, is offered in libation to various deities. In ancient India, memorization of the sacred Vedas included up to eleven forms of recitation of the same text.

The Nātya Shastra is an ancient Indian treatise on the performing arts, encompassing theatre, dance and music. It was written at an uncertain date in classical India (200 BCE–200 CE). The Natya Shastra is based upon the much older Natya Veda which contained 36,000 slokas. Unfortunately there are no surviving copies of the Natya Veda. There are scholars who believe that it may have been written by various authors at different times. The most authoritative commentary on the Natya Shastra is Abhinavabharati by Abhinava Gupta.

While much of the discussion of music in the Natyashastra focuses on musical instruments, it also emphasizes several theoretical aspects that remained fundamental to Indian music:
 Establishment of Shadja as the first, defining note of the scale or grama.
 Two Principles of Consonance: The first principle states that there exists a fundamental note in the musical scale which is Avinashi (अविनाशी) and Avilopi (अविलोपी) that is, the note is ever-present and unchanging. The second principle, often treated as law, states that there exists a natural consonance between notes; the best between Shadja and Tar Shadja, the next best between Shadja and Pancham.
 The Natyashastra also suggests the notion of musical modes or jatis which are the origin of the notion of the modern melodic structures known as ragas. Their role in invoking emotions are emphasized; thus compositions emphasizing the notes gandhara or rishabha are said to be related to tragedy (karuna rasa) whereas rishabha is to be emphasized for evoking heroism (vIra rasa).

Jatis are elaborated in greater detail in the text Dattilam, composed around the same time as the Natyashastra.

China

Most guqin books and tablature written before the twentieth century confirm that this is the origin of the guqin, although now it is viewed as mythology. In Chinese literature the guqin dates back almost 3,000 years, while examples of the instrument have been found in tombs that date back to about 2,000 years ago. Although the ancient literature states its beginnings, the origin of the guqin is still a subject of debate over the past few decades.

Greece

Ancient Greek musicians developed their own robust system of musical notation. The system was not widely used among Greek musicians, but nonetheless a modest corpus of notated music remains from Ancient Greece and Rome. The epics of Homer were originally sung with instrumental accompaniment, but no notated melodies from Homer are known. Several complete songs exist in ancient Greek musical notation. Three complete hymns by Mesomedes of Crete (2nd century CE) exist in manuscript. In addition, many fragments of Greek music are extant, including fragments from tragedy, among them a choral song by Euripides for his Orestes and an instrumental intermezzo from Sophocles' Ajax.

Rome

The music of ancient Rome borrowed heavily from the music of the cultures that were conquered by the empire, including music of Greece, Egypt, and Persia. Music accompanied many areas of Roman life including the military, entertainment in the Roman theater, religious ceremonies and practices, and "almost all public/civic occasions."

The philosopher-theorist Boethius translated into Latin and anthologized a number of Greek treatises, including some on music. His work The Principles of Music (better-known under the title De institutione musica) divided music into three types: Musica mundana (music of the universe), musica humana (music of human beings), and musica instrumentalis (instrumental music).

References

Sources

External links
 Reconstructed bone flutes, sound sample and playing instructions.
 International Study Group on Music Archaeology
 Musica Romana: Ensemble for ancient music
 Ensemble Kérylos, a music group led by scholar Annie Bélis and dedicated to the recreation of ancient Greek and Roman music.